George B. Sloan Estate is a historic home located at Oswego in Oswego County, New York.   It is a -story, irregularly massed, Ithaca limestone building built between 1866 and 1870 in the Italian Villa style.  It features a square, 3-story engaged tower.  Also on the property is a carriage house, cast-iron fence, and fountain.

It was listed on the National Register of Historic Places in 1988.

References

Houses on the National Register of Historic Places in New York (state)
Houses completed in 1870
Houses in Oswego County, New York
National Register of Historic Places in Oswego County, New York